"Bang!" is a song by American pop band AJR. It was released on February 12, 2020, through their own label, AJR Productions. The song is the lead single from the band's fourth album, OK Orchestra.

Background
AJR released their third studio album Neotheater on April 26, 2019. That autumn, they embarked on an extensive North American tour in support of the album. Neotheater debuted to critical and commercial success, with album sales buoyed by the hit single  "100 Bad Days". As a result, AJR announced the "Neotheater World Tour Part II" on November 15, 2019, with tour stops in North America, Europe, and South America, including festival appearances at Lollapalooza Argentina, Chile, and Brazil. The 2020 leg of the tour was postponed indefinitely due to the COVID-19 pandemic. AJR began working on "Bang!" in the process of writing Neotheater, and continued to work on the song throughout the subsequent tour. After struggling with how to make "Bang!" "sound current", the band sidelined the song to finish Neotheater, only returning to it after they finished touring.

AJR explained their motivation for writing the song:
"We wrote 'BANG!' about the weird middle-ground between being a kid and becoming an adult; a time when we're doing all the things adults are supposed to do, but we don't yet feel grown up. The fact is, adulthood is bound to hit us at some point, so the plan we made in the song is to 'go out with a bang'. Sonically, with every new song we make, we try to stretch out of our AJR comfort zone. With 'BANG!,' it felt exciting to step into this darker, horn-heavy vibe, where the verses are small and mysterious, and the chorus explodes into this theatrical trap chorus".

The voice of the song that announces "Here we go!" and "Metronome!" is Charlie Pellett, best known for his voice used on the New York City Subway. When the song was first recorded, Ryan Met initially did the voice, but the group opted to get someone else to do. Their first choice was their father, Gary, and then a neighbor friend of his. AJR had used Pellett's voice for a live show years ago and he had emailed them; thanking them for the tribute. Realizing that they now had his email in their inbox, they asked him to help with the song and he happily obliged.

Composition and lyrics 
"Bang!" is composed in  common time and in the key of C-sharp minor, with a tempo of 70 beats per minute (bpm). AJR's vocals on the song range from B2 at the low end to C#5 at the high end.

Music video
The official video was uploaded on February 12, 2020, directed by Se Oh and features AJR hosting a dice game. The camera remains facing in one direction, only moving back and forth, as the participants playing are seen going through various costume changes with every pan out, ranging from sailors to tuxedos to being nude.

Chart performance
The song entered the US Billboard Hot 100 chart at number 99 and peaked at number 8 on the chart, becoming both the band's first top 40 entry and first top 10 entry, and their highest-charting single overall.

Use in media
In November 2020, Apple used an instrumental version of the chorus in "Bang!" in their holiday commercial. The use in advertisement, coupled with a $0.69 cost on iTunes, pushed "Bang!" to number one on the US iTunes Sales Chart on December 26, dethroning Mariah Carey's "All I Want for Christmas Is You". "Bang!" was also used as the soundtrack of the opening montage at the 27th Screen Actors Guild Awards in 2021.

Personnel
Credits adapted from Tidal.

 Adam Met – vocals, instruments, composer
 Jack Met – main vocals, instruments, composer
 Ryan Met – vocals, instruments, composer, producer
 Charlie Pellett – additional vocals
 JJ Kirkpatrick – trumpet
 Chris Gehringer – mastering engineer
 Joe Zook – mixing engineer

Other versions

Awards
At the 2021 Billboard Music Awards, "Bang!" took home the award for Top Rock Song, beating out "Monsters" by All Time Low, "Heat Waves" by Glass Animals, "My Ex's Best Friend" by Machine Gun Kelly, and "Level of Concern" by Twenty One Pilots. AJR also received nominations in the Top Duo/Group and Top Rock Artist categories, ultimately losing to BTS and Machine Gun Kelly, respectively.

Charts

Weekly charts

Year-end charts

Certifications

References

AJR (band) songs
2020 songs
2020 singles